Mycael Pontes Moreira (born 12 March 2004), simply known as Mycael, is a Brazilian professional footballer who plays as a goalkeeper for Athletico Paranaense and the Brazil national under-20 football team.

Early life
From Porto Velho, Rondônia, his father Moisés Moreira recalls Mycael initially played as a left-back when he first trained with local neighbourhood side Seu Zeca. However, the regular goalkeeper didn’t turn up one day and Mycael played in goal and saved a penalty and made a number of other saves. Mycael has a number of amateur goalkeepers in his family.

Club career
Mycael signed his first professional contract with Athletico Paranaense aged 16 in 2020. In November 2022 the club announced that Maycael would be promoted to the senior first team squad for the 2023 season.

International career
Mycael made his debut with the Brazil under-15 age group team against a Paraguay age group team in July 25, 2019. He won the under-15 South American championship that year, and the following year made his debut for the Brazil under-17 team. He was also named goalkeeper of the tournament at the Revelations Cup in Mexico in 2021.

Mycael won the 2023 South American U-20 Championship with Brazil. He was awarded man of the match for the final game which secured the title for Brazil, against Uruguay. He has also saved a penalty in a match for Brazil against Argentina.
His displays led him to being one of the players singled out from the tournament by South American football pundit Tim Vickery among those who “enhanced their reputations in Colombia [with] careers worth watching”.

On March 3, 2023, Mycael was called up to the senior Brazil squad for the first time as interim coach Ramon Menezes prepared a team to play a friendly match against Morocco.

Personal life
Mycael joined Trieste, an amateur team from Curitiba, in 2017. There, he lived for two years with teammate and fellow goalkeeper Bernardo Pisetta and his family prior to his move to Athletico Paranaense aged 14. Mycael honours his friend Bernardo, who died in the Flamengo training ground fire in 2019, by wearing an under shirt containing his photo underneath his match day jersey, a practice he has said he will continue throughout his career, saying:

References

External links
Athletico Paranaense profile 

2004 births
Living people
People from Porto Velho
Sportspeople from Rondônia
Brazilian footballers
Brazil youth international footballers
Association football goalkeepers
Club Athletico Paranaense players